Jesús Emilio Martínez Álvarez (born 18 September 1944) is a Mexican politician affiliated with the Citizens' Movement (formerly to the Institutional Revolutionary Party). He was interim Governor of Oaxaca from 1985 to 1986 and previously served as municipal president of Oaxaca, Oaxaca from 1978 to 1980.

He also has served as Deputy of the LIX Legislature of the Mexican Congress as a plurinominal representative.

References

1944 births
Living people
People from Oaxaca City
Municipal presidents in Oaxaca
Governors of Oaxaca
Members of the Chamber of Deputies (Mexico)
Institutional Revolutionary Party politicians
Citizens' Movement (Mexico) politicians
Politicians from Oaxaca
20th-century Mexican politicians
21st-century Mexican politicians
Members of the Congress of Oaxaca
Benito Juárez Autonomous University of Oaxaca alumni